These are the results for the girls' 10 metre air pistol event at the 2018 Summer Youth Olympics.

Results

Qualification

Final

References

External links
Qualification results
Final results

Shooting at the 2018 Summer Youth Olympics